"The Last Thing on My Mind" is a song written by American musician and singer-songwriter Tom Paxton in the early 1960s and recorded first by Paxton in 1964. It is based on the traditional lament song "The Leaving of Liverpool". The song was released on Paxton's 1964 album Ramblin' Boy, which was his first album released on Elektra Records.

The song remains one of Paxton's best-known compositions.

Porter Wagoner and Dolly Parton version

"The Last Thing on My Mind" was covered by Porter Wagoner and Dolly Parton and released as their debut duet single on October 30, 1967, by RCA Victor. Their version peaked at number seven on the Billboard Hot Country Singles chart, the first of an almost uninterrupted string of top ten singles they would release over the next several years.

Critical reception
The single was well received by critics upon release. Billboard gave a positive review of the single, which said that Wagoner and Parton's "initial outing should be a giant." They concluded by saying that "the folk-oriented ballad...has much pop potential." In another positive review, Cashbox called the single "a very effective updating of the contemporary folk ditty," with "an appealing blending of voices" which "makes this a good bet for big chart honors."

Commercial performance
"The Last Thing on My Mind" debuted at number 70 on the Billboard Hot Country Singles chart. It would eventually peak at number seven and spend a total of 17 weeks on the chart. The single's B-side, "Love Is Worth Living", was successful in Canada, peaking at number four on the RPM Country Singles chart.

Track listing
7" single (RCA Victor 47-9369)
"The Last Thing on My Mind"  – 2:34
"Love Is Worth Living"  – 2:32

Personnel
Adapted from RCA recording session records.
Jerry Carrigan – drums
Anita Carter – background vocals
Pete Drake – steel
Dolores Edgin – background vocals
Bob Ferguson – producer
Roy M. Huskey Jr. – bass
Mack Magaha – fiddle
George McCormick – rhythm guitar
Wayne Moss – electric guitar
Dolly Parton – lead vocals
Hargus Robbins – piano
Buck Trent – banjo
Porter Wagoner – lead vocals

Charts

Dolly Parton solo version 
A solo version by Dolly Parton was released on February 16, 2023, from the Doc Watson tribute album I Am a Pilgrim: Doc Watson at 100 (set for release on April 28, 2023 by FLi Records/Budde Music).

Other recordings
The song has also been recorded by dozens of artists, including:

 Bill Anderson
 Chet Atkins
 Joan Baez
 Harry Belafonte
 Blitzen Trapper
 Pat Boone
 Dennis Brown
 Chris de Burgh
 Glen Campbell
 The Carter Family
 Johnny Cash (with Diana Trask)
 Liam Clancy
 Gene Clark
 Judy Collins
 Cry, Cry, Cry
 Rick Danko
 Joe Dassin
 Sandy Denny
 John Denver
 Neil Diamond
 The Dillards
 Danny Doyle 
 The Dubliners
 Phil Everly 
 Marianne Faithfull
 José Feliciano
 Julie Felix
 Flatt & Scruggs
 Tompall & the Glaser Brothers
 Noel Harrison
 Carolyn Hester
 Mary Hopkin
 Samuel Hui 
 Joe and Eddie
 The Kingston Trio
 Hank Locklin
 Misty River
 The Chad Mitchell Trio
 Nana Mouskouri
 The Move
 Anne Murray
 Willie Nelson
 Daniel O'Donnell
 Gram Parsons
 Herb Pedersen
 Peter, Paul and Mary
 Punch Brothers
 Stu Phillips
 Charley Pride
 Paddy Reilly with The Dubliners
 Tony Rice
 The Seekers
 Jean Shepard
 Johnny Silvo
 Hank Snow
 Townes Van Zandt
 The Vejtables
 Clarence White
 Delroy Wilson
 Hannes Wader as "Ich werd' es überstehn (Last Thing On My Mind)" with German lyrics
 Doc Watson
 The Womenfolk 
 Bojoura

Soundtrack
It is performed by the Punch Brothers and Stark Sands in the soundtrack of the Coen Brothers' film Inside Llewyn Davis (2013).

References 

1964 songs
1967 debut singles
RCA Victor singles
Dolly Parton songs
Porter Wagoner songs
The Kingston Trio songs
Glen Campbell songs
Peter, Paul and Mary songs
Joe Dassin songs
Songs written by Tom Paxton
Song recordings produced by Bob Ferguson (musician)
Song recordings produced by Paul A. Rothchild